Bryant Alan Rogowski (born November 6, 1970) is an American retired professional wrestler, better known by his ring name, Bryant Anderson. He is the son of professional wrestler Ole Anderson. Anderson wrestled for World Championship Wrestling (WCW) in 1993, as well as wrestling for various independent promotions in the southeastern United States during the mid-1990s.

Early life 
Born in Minneapolis, Minnesota, he was on the Etowah High School wrestling team and had a successful amateur career, winning a Georgia state championship in his senior year at 171 pounds. His father often took time from his wrestling schedule to attend his matches; this was the storyline reason for Ole Anderson's dismissal from The Four Horsemen in 1987. Ole Anderson had missed some shows to watch his son wrestle, and Tully Blanchard called Bryant a "snot nosed kid". Ole attacked Blanchard, and was kicked out and eventually replaced by Lex Luger. Before graduating, he accepted a wrestling scholarship from the University of Tennessee at Chattanooga and finished third in the Southern Conference in the heavyweight division as a junior.

Professional wrestling career

World Championship Wrestling (1993)
During the early 1990s, Bryant was trained at the WCW Power Plant by his father and Jody Hamilton before making his debut on WCW television as a heel in 1993 having a similar build, general look and submission-based wrestling style resembling Ole and Gene Anderson.

However, WCW did not have plans for him: other than teaming occasionally with Diamond Dallas Page, he mostly wrestled as a preliminary wrestler during his last months with the promotion eventually being fired by new WCW head Eric Bischoff before the end of the year.

Smoky Mountain Wrestling (1994–1995)
Briefly competing in Jim Crockett, Jr.'s World Wrestling Network (WWN), he teamed with Tully Blanchard before turning up in Smoky Mountain Wrestling in late 1994, where promoter Jim Cornette used him as a mid-card heel; his father briefly managed him but left after a few appearances.

After fighting to a draw with Tracy Smothers on October 1, he became a main rival of Smothers  following his winning the SMW "Beat the Champ" Television title from Scott Studd in Morganton, North Carolina two days later. Fighting to a series of draws with Smothers in early October, he finally lost to Smothers in an 8-man tag team match with Boo Bradley, Chris Candido and Bruiser Bedlam against Smothers, "Dirty White Boy" Tony Anthony, Brian Lee and Lance Storm in Evarts, Kentucky on November 4, 1994.

Losing to Smothers in Morristown, Tennessee the following night, the two would again fight to a time limit draw and later that night participated in another 8-Man tag team match with Boo Bradley, Chris Candido and Bruiser Bedlam again losing to Smothers, Tony Anthony, Brian Lee and Lance Storm in Hyden, Kentucky on November 6, 1994.

Successfully defending his title against James Adkins, George South and The Nightmare, he was forced to vacate the championship belt on November 7 after a five-week reign. Anderson continued to face Smothers in indecisive draws before losing to him on November 10 and, in a "no time limit" match on November 12. However, Anderson soon avenged his loss defeating Smothers four times at the 4-day Thanksgiving Thunder supercard on November 24–27, 1994.

He eventually lost to Smothers three times in "I Quit" matches during the 3-day Christmas Chaos supercard from December 25–27 and continued to lose to him in rematches later that month.

Continuing his feud with Smothers into early 1995, he also participated in a 16-man battle royal on January 2 and scored victories over Mike Furnus, Ted Allen, Tommy Pitner and The Nightmare. He later faced Smothers in late January, losing to him in a singles match on January 20 and in two "I Quit" matches on January 21 and January 27, before leaving the promotion shortly before its close in November 1995 and retired shortly thereafter.

After retiring, Rogowski attended Georgia State University law school and graduated with a Juris Doctor degree.

Championships and accomplishments
Pro Wrestling Illustrated
PWI ranked him #295 of the 500 best singles wrestlers of the PWI 500 in 1994
Smoky Mountain Wrestling
SMW Beat the Champ Television Championship (1 time)

References

External links 
 

1970 births
American male professional wrestlers
Anderson family
Living people
Professional wrestlers from Minneapolis
Sportspeople from Minneapolis
20th-century professional wrestlers
SMW Beat the Champ Television Champions